The K200 KIFV (Korea Infantry Fighting Vehicle) is a South Korean armored personnel carrier, originally produced by Daewoo Heavy Industries as a domestic replacement for older armored personnel carriers, such as the M113, in front line service with the Republic of Korea Armed Forces at the time of the K200's development. Since 2009 the K200 has been supplemented by the K21. A total of 2,383 K200 vehicles of all configurations were produced between 1985 and 2006, among which are 111 K200A1 vehicles exported to Malaysia.

History

The K200 project began in 1981 when the Republic of Korea Army issued a request for a new Korean Infantry Fighting Vehicle (KIFV) to meet future combat requirements. The Agency for Defense Development was in charge of its development, and Daewoo Heavy Industries was the prime contractor for the production of this vehicle. The K200 was designed to be an amphibious personnel carrier that could cross shallow rivers, based on the chassis of the American Armored Infantry Fighting Vehicle. The AIFV itself was based on the M113 armored personnel carrier.  The vehicle was developed to be more affordable than the AIFV, but not necessarily sacrificing capability, to gain an edge in cost-effectiveness. The eventual domestic development and production of the K200 achieved a price range of US$1.32-1.41 million as opposed to the $1.52-2.83 million price range that a license-production or direct importation of the AIFV would have entailed.

Doosan incorporated the MAN D2848T engine into the K200 under a license-production deal and assimilated its technology using domestic components, a reverse-engineering experience that would prove instrumental in the development of its next IFV, the K21. S&T Dynamics was the licensee subcontractor for the Allison Transmission X200-5K gearbox. The vehicle entered production in 1985. Serial production was completed in 2006.

In October 2017, Hanwha unveiled an internally-funded upgrade project that would turn the K200 into a modular, multi-purpose vehicle. The design involves stretching the chassis and adding a road wheel for six pairs and removing the back section to create a flat cargo bed to fit various modules that can be swapped out for different missions; initial configurations include modules to act as an ambulance, fuel tanker, minelayer, and communications platform. With ROK Army approval, the company could fully mature the project in two years.

General characteristics
The K200 series of vehicles transport mechanized infantry platoon is designed to keep personnel safe from small arms fire. The hull of the KIFV is of all-welded aluminium armor with an additional layer of spaced laminate steel armor bolted to it. The composite armor provides a higher level of protection for less weight. It provides protection against 12.7 mm rounds on the sides, 7.62 mm ammunition in the rear, larger shell splinter from the ground, and anti-personnel mines. The engine compartment is located at the front right of the vehicle and is separated from the remainder of the vehicle by a bulkhead. The engine compartment is fitted with a fire extinguishing system that can be operated by the driver or from outside the vehicle. The air inlet, air outlet louvers and the exhaust pipe are located on the roof of the vehicle to allow amphibious operations.

The K200 has six electrically operated smoke grenade launchers mounted across the front of the hull as countermeasures against electro-optical and infrared targeting. If the KIFV variant features a turret, the smoke grenade launchers mount on the turret (three on each side).

K200 can provide infantry firepower support with 12.7 mm and 7.62 mm machine guns. Stronger anti-infantry and anti-material firepower can be brought to bear by equipping a 20 mm Vulcan gun, or 81 mm and 107 mm mortars. Anti-tank capability can be added by equipping the Metis-M anti-tank missile system. The K200 is highly modular, and its variants provide additional types of combat support such as air defense and vehicle recovery using specialized equipment. The APC can accommodate 12 people including one infantry squad, the driver, and gunners.

In November 2015, Doosan and CMI Defence revealed they had cooperated to create the Cockerill Protected Weapon Station (CPWS) to increase the firepower of the K200.  The turret can support cannons between 20–30 mm, plus a 7.62 mm coaxial machine gun, including the: CPWS20 20 mm; CPWS 25 mm which can be armed with the M242 Bushmaster, Nexter M811, or Oerlikon KBA; and CPWS30 armed with the M230LF.

Variants

 K200: First production variant.
 K216: NBC reconnaissance vehicle. Equipped with detection system to trace sources of NBC agents.
 K221: Smoke generating vehicle. Produces two types of smoke to protect from visible light for 90 minutes and infrared for 30 minutes.
 K242: Carries 4.2 inch mortar for fire support.
 K255: Proposed ammunition resupply vehicle for 155 mm self-propelled howitzer.
 K263 SPAAG: KM167A1 20 mm self-propelled anti-aircraft gun variant of K200.
 K277: Command post vehicle. The vehicle contains various supplements for commanders.
 K281: Carries 81 mm mortar for fire support.
 K288: Recovery vehicle. Rescues and repairs damaged military vehicles.
 K200A1: Upgraded variant of the base K200 with more powerful engines and transmission. The upgrade also added NBC protection and automatic fire extinguishing system.
 K242A1: Carries 4.2 inch mortar for fire support. To be replaced by 120 mm mortar.
 K263A1 SPAAG: KM167A1 20 mm M61 Vulcan self-propelled anti-aircraft gun variant of K200A1.
 K263A3 SPAAG: Improved version of K263A1. A3 features such as improved FCS, electronic protection, safety, etc. All A1 have been upgraded to A3.
 K281A1: Carries 81 mm mortar for fire support.
 K288A1: Recovery vehicle. Rescues and repairs damaged military vehicles.

Operators

  - 111 K200A1 in service.

See also
Egyptian Infantry Fighting Vehicle
FNSS ACV-15 - Turkish built version of the AIFV

References

External links

 K200A1 - Armored Vehicles - Hanwha Defense
 GlobalSecurity.org
 K200 Series on Armour.ws
 Federation of American Scientists

Tracked infantry fighting vehicles
Armoured personnel carriers of South Korea
Military vehicles introduced in the 1980s